A by-election occurred in the South Australian House of Assembly seat of Port Adelaide on 11 February 2012. Labor's Susan Close won the seat on a 52.9 percent two-candidate-preferred (TCP) vote. The by-election was triggered by the resignation of former Deputy Premier, Treasurer and state Labor MHA Kevin Foley.

Background
Foley and Mike Rann resigned from their parliamentary seats, which created twin by-elections for 11 February, the other being the 2012 Ramsay by-election. On two-party-preferred vote (TPP) margins of 12.8 and 18.0 points from the 2010 election, considered safe margins on the current pendulum, Labor would have likely retained both seats on the TPP vote based on unchanged statewide Newspoll since the previous election. In the lower house, 24 seats form a majority, the Labor government held 26 of 47 seats. If one or both seats had been lost, Labor would still have retained majority government.

Foley was first elected as the member for the new north-western metropolitan seat of Hart at the 1993 election. Hart was mostly replaced with a recreated Port Adelaide ahead of the 2002 election, and Foley followed most of his constituents into the new seat. From Rann Labor's election to government in 2002 until 2011, Foley became the longest-serving Deputy Premier of South Australia and the third-longest-serving Treasurer of South Australia.

The last by-election was the 2009 Frome by-election, when another former Premier, Rob Kerin, retired from politics. The seat was narrowly won by an independent candidate.

Timeline

Candidates

A record nine candidates nominated for the seat of Port Adelaide. The Liberal Party, Family First Party, and independent candidate Max James, who contested the previous election and gained a primary vote of 26.8 percent, 5.9 percent, and 11.0 percent respectively, did not contest the by-election.

Polling
Three opinion polls were conducted and released by the in-house polling group at The Advertiser, Adelaide's main newspaper:

On 21 September 2011, 642 voters were polled in the seat. Before either major party decided on a candidate, Labor's primary vote was at 37 percent (49.9 percent at the last election), the Liberals on 31 percent (26.8 percent), Johanson on 14 percent, the Greens on 11 percent (6.3 percent), and other independents with 6 percent.
On 18 January 2012, 475 voters were polled in the seat. Since the September 2011 poll, there had been a change of Premier, Labor preselected Close, Foley formally resigned from parliament, and the Liberal Party declined to field a candidate. Labor's primary vote was at 48 percent, Johanson on 23 percent, the LDP on 14 percent, Lawrie on 9 percent, the Greens on 3 percent, with remaining candidates on about 3 percent collectively.
On 1 February 2012, 402 voters were polled in the seat, with Labor on 44 percent, Lawrie on 18 percent, Johanson on 14 percent, the Greens on 12 percent, and remaining candidates including the LDP on about 12 percent collectively.

Under instant runoff voting with voters' full preference allocation, on the above polling and without a Liberal candidate, it was possible for one of several candidates to win. On how-to-vote cards located on all polling booths at each polling place, Briton recommended preferences to the Greens and then Labor, the Greens recommended preferences to Labor, Thomas had a split ticket recommending Labor or Johanson, while the remaining party and independent candidates including Johanson generally recommended preferences between each other in varying order. The by-election was expected to be a close contest on both eliminated candidate preference flows and the final TCP vote.

Result

Labor retained the seat on a 52.9 percent TCP vote against Johanson, with a majority in seven of 11 polling places. Postal votes were included on 13 February, absentee and pre-poll votes were included on 14 February. Preference distributions occurred on 18 February. Results are final.

Neither a TPP or TCP swing could be produced, as the 2010 result was between Labor and Liberal rather than Labor and independent with no Liberal candidate. An increase or decrease in margins in these situations cannot be meaningfully interpreted as swings. As explained by the Australian Broadcasting Corporation's Antony Green, when a major party does not contest a by-election, preferences from independents or minor parties that would normally flow to both major parties does not take place, causing asymmetric preference flows. Examples of this are the 2008 Mayo and 2002 Cunningham federal by-elections, with seats returning to TPP form at the next election. This contradicted News Ltd claims of large swings and a potential Liberal Party win in Port Adelaide at the next election. At the 2014 election, Port Adelaide was Labor's 7th safest seat on a margin of over 10 percent. Johanson unsuccessfully contested the neighbouring seat of Lee at the 2014 election with a primary vote of 11.2 percent.

See also
 List of South Australian House of Assembly by-elections

References

External links
A Comment on the Size of the Port Adelaide Swing: Antony Green ABC 13 February 2012
Candidate "how-to-vote" preference cards for the 2012 Port Adelaide by-election: ECSA
2012 Port Adelaide by-election guide: ABC elections
Two By-elections for South Australia?, Antony Green: ABC elections 1 August 2011
Port Adelaide and Ramsay By-elections, Antony Green: ABC elections 20 December 2011
Port Adelaide and Ramsay By-election Updates, Antony Green: ABC elections 19 January 2012

2012 elections in Australia
South Australian state by-elections
2010s in Adelaide